N-po generation (Hangul: N포세대; Hanja: N抛世代; RR: N-posedae, "Numerous giving-up generation") is a new term for the generation of people who have given up on numerous things in South Korea. It first began as Sampo generation, and was then expanded to the 'Generation who gave up on n number of things'. Sampo Generation refers to a generation that has given up three things: dating, marriage, and having children, while Opo Generation has given up five things, adding owning a home and having a career to the list of things given up on by the Sampo generation. The Chilpo generation refers to the generation who gave up seven things, adding hope/hobby and human relations to Opo generation.

Currently, many young people in their 20s and 30s in South Korea are giving up on dating and marriage and putting off having children without a commitment, on the grounds that they cannot afford to take care of themselves, let alone a family, due to economic and social pressures such as soaring prices, tuition fees, job shortages and home prices. These people belonging to the N-po generation are also referred to as Sampo generation. In a similar term, Japan refers to the Satori generation.

Origin and expansion of the word 
This is a new term coined by the special task force of Kyunghyang Shinmun's planning series "Speaking a Welfare Country" in 2011. The press team defined "Sampo Generation" as "young people who delay dating, marriage, childbirth or no commitment due to excessive living costs such as unstable jobs, repayment of student loans, preparation for a job without a commitment, and soaring housing prices." It is a term coined to show that the burden of Korean families who have taken on the welfare that the state is not responsible has reached a critical point, eventually reaching a state of disintegration of the traditional family form. On the economic perspective, the term is both economically depressed and at the same time the domestic market is shrinking because Korea is heavily dependent on large exporters. This can be defined as a country where stagflation is a common practice due to low economic growth and very low wages and rising prices due to its unique economic structure, resulting in higher cost of living compared to low income, resulting in the creation of such terms. Since then, it has spread socially through various media, political circles and the Internet, and has become a symbolic term to reveal the lives of young people and the challenges of our society. Not only Korea but also the U.S., which says independence by the age of 20, is becoming more economically dependent on parents due to the recent shortage of jobs, and the reality of Millennials, which was noted until a few years ago, can be seen as similar to Korea's Sampo generation

Sociological analysis 
The main cause of the word's birth is assumed to be the economic and social pressures of modern society on young people.

  Many young people in Korea tend to regard love as a luxury, overwhelmed by the social climate of paying back student loans, suffering from excessive housing and living expenses, and pushing them to be the best specs, if not a first-rate company, because of the social structure that values only large companies.

 The generalization of business-enemy wedding halls, which carefully assess each other's specifications instead of romantic ones, and the rapid increase in wedding costs.

  It is frustrating to many young people who do not meet relatively the conditions for marriageable.

  Even if they are married, they will be burdened with the cost of child care, and the low birth rate trend caused by these economic pressures and the lack of social consideration for working mothers are the main factors that make young couples hesitate to give birth.

Consequences 
In the modern age, the need for marriage has disappeared, and the sense that marriage is not necessary has spread. Marriage and child care have changed from necessity to choice. And, socially, it can talk about the decreasing birth rate due to late marriage or not getting married, the personal burden of marriage and child care is lifted, the depression is brought, the suicide rate is increased, and the consequent acceleration of an aging society and the absence of a generation responsible for the welfare of the elderly.

Smaller concepts 
Opo(giving up five things) Generation is a generation that has given up human relations and homes in additional to Sampo generation, which has given up giving up childbirth, marriage and dating. The Chilpo(giving up seven things) generation gave up their dreams and hopes to the Opo generation, which added giving up personal relationship to Sampo generation.

See also 
 9X Generation
 Buddha-like mindset
 Freeter
 Hell Joseon
 Spoon class theory
 Working poor
 Sampo generation
 Strawberry generation
 Tang ping

References 

Cultural generations
South Korean culture